Tokyo Disneyland Electrical Parade Dreamlights ~Christmas~ is the Christmas version of the Tokyo Disneyland Electrical Parade Dreamlights. It opened in 2007 and runs during the holidays. The parade includes the regular floats and characters dressed up for the holidays. The soundtrack is almost identical to the regular, but has a holiday theme.

Song index 
 Tokyo Disneyland Electrical Parade Dreamlights ~Christmas~
 OPENING WINDOW & ANNOUNCEMENT (Fanfare of Lights (Don Dorsey))- "Ladies and gentlemen, boys and girls! Tokyo Disneyland proudly presents our most spectacular pageant of nighttime dreams and fantasy. In millions of sparkling lights, and brilliant musical sounds: Tokyo Disneyland Electrical Parade: DreamLights!"
Blue Fairy & Knights of Light
Baroque Hoedown (Perrey/Kingsley)
Jingle Bells (James Lord Pierpont)
 Deck the Hall (Traditional)
Mickey’s Dreamlights Train- Mickey Mouse, Minnie Mouse, & Santa Goofy
Baroque Hoedown (Perrey/Kingsley)
Jingle Bells (Pierpont)
 Deck the Hall (Traditional)
Alice in Wonderland (1951 film)- Alice, Chester Cat, Snails, Centipede
All in the Golden Afternoon (Fain/Hillard)
The Caucus Race (Fain/Hillard)
In a world of My Own (Fain/Hillard)
‘Twas Brilling (Raye/L. Carol/De Paul)
The Unbirthday Song (David/Livingston/Hoffman)
Jingle Bells (Pierpont)
 Up on the Housetop (Traditional)
Sleigh Ride (Parish/L. Anderson)
Pete's Dragon- Elliot the Dragon, Pete
Brazzle Dazzle Day (Kasha/Hirschhorn)
It's Not Easy (Kasha/Hirschhorn)
Jingle Bells (Pierpont)
Joy to the World (Traditional)
O Come All Ye Faithful (Traditional)
Snow White and the Seven Dwarfs (1937 film)
The Beautiful Snow White
With a Smile and a Song (Churchill/Morey)
Joy to the World (Traditional)
"White Christmas" (song) (I.Berlin)
I’m Wishing (Churchill/Morey)
Peter Pan (1953 film)- Peter, Wendy, Hook, Smee
Peter Pan Suite
 Deck the halls
 12 days of Christmas
Aladdin (1992 film)
Genie
Friend Like Me (Ashman/Menken)
Aloha Oe (Lil'uokalani Queen)
When You Wish Upon a Star (Harline/Washington)
March of the Cards (Fain)
Never Smile at a Crocodile (Churchill/Lawrence)
Nemo Egg (T. Newman)
Jingle Bells (Pierpont)
Aladdin and Jasmine
Arabian Nights (Ashman/Menken)
Prince Ali (Ashman/Menken)
Jingle Bells (Pierpont)
 Rudolph, the red nosed reindeer
Deck the Halls
Tangled (2010 film)
Rapunzel and Eugene Flynn Rider
Healing Incantation (Alan Menken)
I see the light (Alan Menken)
Jingle Bells (James Pierpont P.D.)
Joy to the World (Georg Friedrich Handel P.D.)
We Wish you a Merry Christmas (Traditional) (2015-2017)
 Jingle Bells (traditional) (2017- present)
Toy Story 3
We Belong Together (R.Newman)
You've Got a Friend in Me (R.Newman)
The Parade of the Tin Soldiers (L.Jessel)
Deck the Halls
Hark the herald angels sing
Cars 2
Bad Medicine (Motorhead)
Real Gone (Sherly Crow)
Get Munked (The Loud Family)
Hot Hot Hot
Free Ride
Finding Nemo – Nemo and Crush
Beyond the Sea (Larsy/C.L.Trenet/Lawrence)
It’s the Most Wonderful Time of the Year (Pola/Wyle)
Monsters, Inc.
If I didn’t Have You (Newman)
Here Comes Santa Claus (Down Santa Claus Lane) (Autry/Haldeman)
Cinderella (1950 film)
Fairy Godmother & Cinderella
Frosty the Snowman (Nelson/ Rollins)
Bibbidi Bobbibidi Boo (David/Livingston/Hoffman)
Cindrella (David/Livingston/Hoffman)
We Wish You a Merry Christmas (Traditional)
Cinderella's Ball
 Cinderella (David/Livingston/Hoffman)
A Dream is a Wish Your Heart Makes (David/Livingston/Hoffman)
We Wish You a Merry Christmas (Traditional)
Tinkerbell
Fly to Your Heart (M. tumes)
To the Fairies They Draw Near (L.Mckennitt)
We Wish You a Merry Christmas (Traditional)
Hark the Herald Angels Sing
It's a Small World / “Finale”- Various Disney Characters
It’s a Small World (After All) (Sherman/Sherman)
Jingle Bells (Pierpont)
Unisys Sponsor Unit & Closing Window
Jingle Bells (Pierpont)
DreamLights Theme Variation (Greg Smith)
Closing Announcement (Fanfare of Lights (Don Dorsey))- “Tokyo Disneyland Electrical Parade Dreamlights!”

Credits and Production
Executive Producer/ Music Director- Steve Skorija
Arranging/ Composition- Greg Smith
Recorded and Mixed by John Richards
Pro Tools Music Editor- Michael Atwell
Recorded by The Czech Film Orchestra
Music Supervision- Savant Productions
Music Preparation- Express Music Services
Mixed at Skywalker Sounds
Executive Producer- Etsuko Nagashima
Managing Producer- Satoshi Hayashi
Creative Director- Kazuhiro Watarumi
Producer- Kay Okuno
Show Director- Michi Ariga
Music Director- Tsutomu Takeuchi
Recording and Mixing Engineer- Atsushi Kobayashi

Character voices
Like its counterpart Tokyo Disneyland Electrical Parade Dreamlights ~Christmas~ is in both English and Japanese.

Rosalyn Landor as the Blue Fairy
Takashi Aoyagi as Mickey Mouse
Yū Shimaka as Goofy and Genie (Aladdin)
Yūko Mizutani as Minnie Mouse
Kat Cressida as Alice and Wendy Darling
 Blayne Weaver as Peter Pan
Corey Burton as Captain Hook and Mr. Smee
Sean Marshall as Pete
Carolyn Gardner  as Snow White
Toshiaki Karasawa as Woody
Yumi Kusaka as Jessie
George Tokoro as Buzz Lightyear
Hidehiko Ishizuka as Sulley
Yūji Tanaka as Mike Wazowski
Airi Inoue as Boo
Keita Miyatani as Nemo
Rikiya Koyama as Crush
Hiroshi Tsuchida as Lightning McQueen
Hisako Kyōda as Fairy Godmother
Mae Whitman as Tinkerbell
Scott Weinger as Aladdin
Linda Larkin as Princess Jasmine
Mandy Moore as Rapunzel
Zachary Levi as Flynn Rider
Greg Smith as Announcer

References

External links
 Tokyo Disney Resort web site in Japanese and English 
 Tokyo Disneyland Electrical Parade Dreamlights Homepage 

Electrical Parade Dreamlights Christmas
Walt Disney Parks and Resorts parades
Christmas and holiday season parades